José Ulisses de Pina Correia e Silva (born 4 June 1962) is a Cape Verdean businessman and politician who has been Prime Minister of Cape Verde since 22 April 2016.

He took office after his party, the Movement for Democracy, won the 20 March 2016 parliamentary election.

Early life and education
In 1988, Silva graduated from the School of Economics and Business Management at the Technical University of Lisbon.

Early career
Silva started his career in the banking sector. He was the director of administration at the Bank of Cape Verde from 1989 to 1994. He also taught at the Jean Piaget University of Cape Verde.

Political career
Silva served in the government of Cape Verde as Secretary of State for Finance from 1995 to 1998 and Minister of Finance from 1999 to 2001. Between 2006 and 2008, Silva was Vice-President of the Movement for Democracy (MpD) political party. In 2008, he was elected as the Mayor of Praia, and he was reelected as Mayor in 2013. Silva also became the President of the MpD in 2013.

Silva was also the executive president of UCCLA (the Union of Afro-Pan-American-Asiatic Lusophony Capital Cities) in 2013 and later became the president of IDC Africa in November 2014.

Prime Minister
In June 2016, Silva and Finance Minister Olavo Correia met with representatives from the International Monetary Fund to discuss Cape Verde's economy. A few months later, in September 2016, Silva and members of his government met with the IMF to discuss the 2016 Article IV consultation.

Silva was reappointed to the leadership of the Movement for Democracy (MpD), with 99 percent of the votes cast, in February 2020. Thus, he is the candidate of the MpD to the 2021 legislatures, running for his own succession.

References 

1962 births
Movement for Democracy (Cape Verde) politicians
Government ministers of Cape Verde
Living people
Members of the National Assembly (Cape Verde)
People from Praia
Presidents of municipalities in Cape Verde
Prime Ministers of Cape Verde
Finance ministers of Cape Verde
Technical University of Lisbon alumni